Inclusion body rhinitis (IBR), or cytomegalic inclusion disease, is a pig disease caused by Suid betaherpesvirus 2 (SuHV-2), which is a member of the herpesvirus family. It is a notifiable disease that is found worldwide. It is spread both vertically and horizontally and prevalence is high.

It is not zoonotic but the risk to humans that receive pig organ transplants is currently under investigation.

Clinical signs 
Clinical signs are normally only seen in either piglets less than 3 weeks old or pregnant sows.

Signs in piglets include rhinitis, pneumonia, anaemia, fever and sudden death. Black discoloration around the eyes is often seen and gastrointestinal and neurological signs are also reported.

Signs in pregnant sows include reproductive failure, genital ulceration and agalactia.

Diagnosis 
A presumptive diagnosis can be made based on the history and clinical signs. Definitive diagnosis is achieved by direct or indirect fluorescent-antibody testing (FAT), PCR, post mortem (signs include petechia and pulmonary congestion), histopathology or electron microscopy.

Treatment and control 
Often no treatment is required. However, as Suid betaherpesvirus 2 is a member of Herpesviridae it remains latent and sheds at times of stress. Therefore, husbandry measures to minimise stress levels should be in place.

References 

 Inclusion body rhinitis, reviewed and published by Wikivet at http://en.wikivet.net/Inclusion_Body_Rhinitis, accessed 08/09/2011.

Swine diseases
Viral respiratory tract infections
Betaherpesvirinae